Eyal Shulman (אייל שולמן; born September 17, 1987) is an Israeli basketball player for Ironi Ramat Gan, who plays the point guard position. He was named the 2013 Israeli Basketball Premier League Most Improved Player.

Biography
Shulman was born in Petah Tikva, Israel. He is 6' 4" tall (193 cm).

He played in the 2011 Summer Universiade.	

Shulman has played previously for Maccabi Rishon Lezion, GreenTops Netanya, Ironi Nahariya, Hapoel Holon, Maccabi Kiryat Gat, and Hapoel Tel Aviv. He was named the 2013 Israeli Basketball Premier League Most Improved Player.

References

External links
Instagram page

Living people

Hapoel Holon players
Ironi Nahariya players

Hapoel Tel Aviv B.C. players
Israeli men's basketball players

1987 births
People from Petah Tikva
Maccabi Rishon LeZion basketball players
Point guards